The Mayan languages are a group of languages spoken by the Maya peoples. The Maya form an enormous group of approximately 7 million people who are descended from an ancient Mesoamerican civilization and spread across the modern-day countries of: Mexico, Belize, Guatemala, Honduras, and El Salvador. Speaking descendant languages from their original Proto-Mayan language, some of their languages were recorded in the form of 'glyphs' of a Mayan script.

Languages 
The languages are shown along with their population estimates, as available.

See also
 Mesoamerican languages
 Mesoamerican Linguistic Area
 List of Oto-Manguean languages
 

Mayan